List of the National Register of Historic Places listings in Kent County, Delaware

Contents:  Divisions in Delaware

Current listings

|}

Former listing

|}

References

Kent County, Delaware
Kent